Janchiviin Sündorj (born 16 August 1994) is a Mongolian footballer who plays as a midfielder for Mongolian Premier League club Ulaanbaatar and the Mongolian national team.

References

1994 births
Living people
Mongolian footballers
Mongolia international footballers
Association football midfielders
Mongolian National Premier League players